INSP can refer to:

 A short form of Inspector
 INSP (TV network), a cable television network
 Institut national du service public, an educational institution in France
 International Network of Street Papers